Cycling competitions at the 2022 Bolivarian Games in Valledupar, Colombia were held from 24 June to 2 July 2022 at three venues across Valledupar and at one sub-venue in Cali.

Twenty medal events were scheduled to be contested in the four disciplines of BMX, mountain biking, road cycling and track cycling. In each discipline there were the same events for both men and women. A total of 191 cyclists competed in the events. The events were open competitions without age restrictions.

Colombia, who were the competition defending champions after Santa Marta 2017, won the cycling competitions again after winning 17 of the 20 gold medals at stake.

Participating nations
A total of 10 nations (all the 7 ODEBO nations and 3 invited) registered athletes for the cycling competitions. Each nation was able to enter a maximum of 54 athletes (27 per gender) distributed by disciplines as follows:

BMX: 4 athletes (2 per gender)
Mountain biking: 4 athletes (2 per gender)
Road cycling: 16 athletes (8 per gender)
Track cycling: 30 athletes (15 per gender)

Only Guatemala did not register participants.

Venues
BMX, mountain biking and road cycling were held in Valledupar, while track cycling competitions took place in Cali, a sub-venue outside Valledupar.

Medal summary

BMX

Mountain biking

Road cycling

Track cycling

Medal table

References

External links
Bolivarianos Valledupar 2022 BMX racing
Bolivarianos Valledupar 2022 Mountain biking
Bolivarianos Valledupar 2022 Road cycling
Bolivarianos Valledupar 2022 Track cycling

2022 Bolivarian Games
Bolivarian Games
Bolivarian Games
Bolivarian Games
Bolivarian Games
Bolivarian Games
Cycle races in Colombia